The White Peak Loop is a  route for walking, cycling and horse riding in the Peak District of England. The trail combines sections of the  High Peak Trail and the Monsal Trail with linking sections through the towns of Buxton, Bakewell and Matlock. The White Peak Loop is being developed by Derbyshire County Council and  some sections are not yet complete.

Route 
Sections clockwise from Buxton:

 Buxton to Chee Dale through Woo Dale – , proposed on and off road unfinished
 Monsal Trail from Chee Dale to Bakewell – , along former Manchester, Buxton, Matlock and Midlands Junction Railway line, opened in 1981
 Bakewell to Rowsley – proposed  offroad track, unfinished
 Rowsley to Matlock –  offroad track following the line of the former Midland railway line, with a detour into Whitworth Park, opened in 2018
 Matlock to Cromford – , road
 High Peak Trail from Cromford to Dowlow – , along former Cromford and High Peak Railway line
 From Dowlow through Earl Sterndale and along Dale Head Road – , quiet lanes
 From Dale Head Road over Staker Hill to Harpur Hill – , offroad track completed in 2018
 Harpur Hill to Buxton – , road; proposed alternative  traffic-free route is unfinished

Access 
The High Peak Trail section links with the Tissington Trail, the Pennine Bridleway and the Midshires Way at Parsley Hay.

The White Peak Loop follows the Sustrans-sponsored National Cycle Route 54 from Cromford to Parsley Hay and National Cycle Route 68 from Parsley Hay to Buxton.

There are car parks on the High Peak Trail at Hurdlow, Parsley Hay, Friden, Minninglow, Middleton Top and Black Rocks.

There are car parks on the Monsal Trail at Bakewell, Hassop Station, Monsal Head, Tideswell Dale, Millers Dale and Wyedale.

External links 

 Peak District National Park – Monsal Trail
 Peak District National Park - High Peak Trail

References 

Cycleways in England
Footpaths in Derbyshire
Peak District